Arthur Warburton (10 September 1909 – 13 May 1972) was an English footballer. His regular position was as a forward. He was born in Bury, Greater Manchester. He played for Sedgley Park, Manchester United, Burnley, Nelson, Fulham and Queens Park Rangers, as well as guesting for several clubs during the Second World War.

 He also played rugby. His statue is in St. George's Park, the FAs national trading centre.

References

External links
MUFCInfo.com profile

1909 births
1972 deaths
English footballers
Manchester United F.C. players
Burnley F.C. players
Nelson F.C. players
Fulham F.C. players
Rochdale A.F.C. wartime guest players
Footballers from Bury, Greater Manchester
Queens Park Rangers F.C. players
Association football forwards